Astarté is an opera in four acts and five scenes by Xavier Leroux to a libretto by Louis de Gramont. It was premiered at the Opéra de Paris on 15 February 1901, directed by Pedro Gailhard.

The protagonist is the hero Heracles, who falls under the control of the Lydian queen Omphale. Omphale is depicted as a cultist of Astarte.

Roles

Synopsis

Act 1 
Heracles, Duke of Argos, plans to undertake a new campaign to destroy the infamous cult of the goddess Astarte. He will go to Lydia, in order to exterminate the queen Omphale,  a cruel and indecent sectarian of this goddess. Nothing can hold him back, not even the love of his wife Deianira. She wants to use a talisman to warn him against Omphale's seductions, which she fears. This talisman is the famous tunic of the centaur Nessos that the latter gave her, telling her that when Hercules put it on, he would never look at another woman again. She therefore instructs Iole, her ward, to follow in her husband's footsteps and give him the box containing the bloody tunic.

Act 2 
Heracles arrives with his people in Lydia, under the walls of Sardis. Hercules and his warriors are outside the city gates. Hercules leaves for a moment, then the women of Sardis take the opportunity to charm his soldiers, who follow them into the city singing and dancing, so that when Hercules returns he finds no one but the high priest Phur, who invites him to enter himself.

Act 3 
Heracles is in the palace of Omphale, which he has come to destroy. However, when he is in the presence of Omphale, he throws down his weapons and falls to her knees, bewitched. Indeed, she, in love and pride, demands that the entire city witness such an astonishing submission. While Heracles remains prostrate, Phur performs the ceremony of the cult of Astarte. First there are serious rites, slow dances, then, little by little, an immense furious joy seizes the priests and priestesses, courtesans and guards and it is a  mystical and frenetic orgy of passion and possession. Omphale extends her arms to Hercules who rushes into them.

Act 4 
In the morning, Heracles and Omphale sing of their happiness in a triumphant way. The lover had never known such exhilaration; the lover had never shuddered under such an embrace. Phur disturbs this agreement. He shows Heracles the fragility of such ties that only marriage would make lasting. Omphale, to whom the marriage is proposed, does not want to consent to it and, in the face of the anger caused by her refusal, she asks Astarte to put an end to this embarrassing adventure. Iole is brought in, disguised as a boy. She explains the mission she is in charge of and Omphale, who guesses her sex and calls her Eros' sweet sister, allows her to accomplish it, on the condition that she stays with her and never leaves her. Their voices unite tenderly and Heracles, now dressed in the magical tunic and in the grip of the intolerable suffering of fire, screams and twists. He throws shreds of red cloth against the walls that are burning. And the city also burns and hearts and bodies are set on fire and it is to Lesbos that Omphale now returns to worship Astarte and glorify all lust.

Critics at the premiere 
Astarté was favourably received at its premiere. Alfred Bruneau, the critic of Le Figaro applauded the work and wrote 

Arthur Pougin is not kind and seemingly responding to Bruneau wrote in Le Ménestrel: 

Modern analysis 
Alex Ross of The New Yorker wrote  and Ross indicates that the German magazine Jahrbuch für sexuelle Zwischenstufen noted: "Astarté is probably the first opera to be performed, and generally the first theatre piece, in which lesbian love is represented."

References

Sources 

External links 
 

Operas by Xavier Leroux
1901 operas
French-language operas
Operas based on classical mythology
Opera world premieres at the Paris Opera
Operas
Astarte
Heracles in fiction
Lydia
Operas set in Turkey